Rhynchostegium murale is a species of moss belonging to the family Brachytheciaceae and native to Europe and eastern Asia.

References

Hypnales